Tanyard Creek is a stream in Benton County in northwest Arkansas. It is a tributary of Little Sugar Creek in the Bella Vista resort region of northwest Benton County.

The stream flows north and northeast through the Bella Vista community where is contained to form Lake Windsor. Below the dam the stream crosses under Arkansas Highway 340 to its confluence with Little Sugar Creek just north of Bella Vista Village and adjacent to U.S. Route 71.

References

Rivers of Arkansas
Rivers of Benton County, Arkansas